The Montreal and Southern Counties Railway Company (often abbreviated M&SCRC or M&SC) was an electric interurban streetcar line that served communities between Montreal and Granby from 1909 until 1956. A second branch served the city of Longueuil. Operated by the Canadian National Railway (CN), the M&SCRC ran trams on tracks in the street in Montreal and closer South Shore communities, and on separate right of way in rural areas.

History

Founding and Initial Service 

The Montreal and Southern Counties Railway Company was established through an act of Canadian Parliament on June 29, 1897, with a mandate to "lay out, construct and operate, by electricity or any other mechanical power except steam, a railway [...] from a point in or near the northern limit of the county of Chambly [...] to a point in or near the city of Sherbrooke."

In 1905, a bus company running from Montreal to St. Lambert was failing. After amending the company charter, M&SC "was empowered to take [over the bus company] and replace it with an electric railway."

It took years to fight opposition to the laying of tracks from the Montreal Street Railway and to negotiate access to the downstream shoulder of the Victoria Jubilee Bridge with the Grand Trunk Railway (GTR). GTR purchased a controlling interest in the company in exchange for a "generous infusion of money to get construction."

In spring 1909, M&SC laid tracks along Riverside, Mill, Common, Grey Nun and Youville Streets in Montreal. By end of October, tracks were laid all the way to St. Lambert City Hall. A celebration was held October 31, and official service began on November 1.

Expansion 

May 28, 1910, service was extended to Montreal South (now a part of Vieux-Longueuil at the foot of the Jacques-Cartier Bridge) and to the city of Longueuil (which at that time covered the Old Longueuil Heritage Site).

In 1911 a southern branch was built from the foot of the Victoria bridge, to link St. Lambert to the Ranelagh Country Club and opened on Labour Day "to accommodate golfers." That branch was then continued east through Greenfield Park and Mackayville, junctioning with the GTR main line to St. Hyacinthe. Service to these communities started on November 1, 1912.

In 1913 work began to electrify the Central Vermont Railway line between the GTR junction northeast of Mackayville and Marieville. Interurban service expanded rapidly along this existing track:

 June 6, 1913: Service opened all the way to Richelieu.
 September 28, 1913: Service expanded to Marieville.
 May 3, 1914: Opening of service on new track to St. Césaire.

The Company came to a ten-year agreement with town of Granby to run trains on its Main Street (now rue Principale). In 1915 and 1916 new tracks were laid from St. Césaire to Granby. Service to Abbotsford and Granby finally opened on April 30, 1916, with a workshop at the corner of Main and Pie-IX Boulevard.

On June 1, 1926 there was a new spur opened between Marieville and Ste. Angèle, after electrifying a rail line previously abandoned by Central Vermont.

There were reports in 1915 of further expansion plans—from Longueuil to Boucherville; from Richelieu to Sorel; and from the Country Club to La Prairie. None of these materialized. Neither was service ever extended from Granby to Sherbrooke as was its original mandate.

The creation of the railway coincided with an increase in population in the areas serviced. According to the Census, communities along the railway in Chambly County grew 36% between 1911 and 1921 censuses; Granby city and surrounding township grew by 35% in the same period, while communities in Rouville County grew by 8%.

Decline 

The streetcar was moved out of the city centre of Granby in 1925. Residents and business in Granby complained about the company's operations down its main street. In winter, the streetcar snow plow would leave snow banks that impeded other traffic. A bypass to the CN station in Granby was built and the original Main Street track was discontinued.

By 1928 annual ridership was up to 3.5 m passengers, and the company moved 152 metric tonnes of freight. During the Great Depression, however, ridership fell by 1 million from its peak, and revenue for the company was halved.

Service to Longueuil was cut in 1931. A first spur in Longueuil that led to the wharf used by the Richelieu and Ontario Navigation Company was abandoned in 1915. In 1926, the St. Charles Street portion of the Longueuil line stopped being used. Ultimately service to Longueuil was cut altogether in April 1931, coinciding with the opening of the new Harbour Bridge. At that same time, the Montreal Tramways Company began offering bus service to Longueuil over the new bridge. (Streetcar tracks were laid on the bridge but never used.) A loop for the streetcars to turn around was installed at the corner of Ste. Hélène and Lafayette Streets in Montreal South, near the foot of the bridge, and became the new end of the line.

Throughout the 1930s the railway lost money, but its importance as a means of transportation during the war years ensured that the company remained a going concern. After the war in 1946, ridership peaked at 5,732,000 annual passengers, primarily on its suburban service. From then on, as car ownership and the regional road network grew, ridership steadily declined.

Some time before 1937, the spur leading to Ranelagh Golf Club is abandoned.

Financial Difficulties and End of Service 

From 1916 to 1955, the company only ever covered its annual bond interest once. After-tax operating deficits between 1931 and 1955 totalled $5 million. The parent company, Grand Trunk, struggled from its own financial difficulties and was ultimately nationalized into Canadian National Railway in 1923. Montreal & Southern Counties continued to operate under the CN Electric Railways division.

On November 11, 1951, CN began cutting back its rail service in rural Southeastern Quebec. M&SC stopped electric operation beyond Marieville. CN replaced the service with three daily diesel-powered trains from Waterloo through Granby and Marieville, along the former railway's track until the junction to the St. Hyacinthe subdivision where it would go directly to Montreal's Central Station. This change coincided with the end of passenger service between Waterloo and Montreal through Granby, Farnham and Saint-Jean-sur-Richelieu.

In 1952, Greenfield Park officials were told that service would soon end. Service over the Victoria Bridge between St. Lambert and Montreal was stopped on June 15, 1955 as part of the Saint Lawrence Seaway construction. The downstream shoulder was opened to car traffic.

Finally, all operations of the Montreal and Southern Counties Railway ended on October 13, 1956.

Service

Service to Montreal 

The Montreal McGill Street Terminal was situated at the south-west corner of McGill Street and Rue Marguerite-d'Youville.

Street cars would run on a track set up along the downstream side of the Victoria Bridge where today street traffic runs.

Suburban tramways 

At the South Shore terminus of the Victoria Bridge, at a station called East End, trains would go in one of two directions to provide suburban service:

 Montreal South/Longueuil: One branch would follow the bottom of CN main line embankment to Elm Street. This location hosted M&SCRC's car houses, offices, and a station. The track would then continue up Elm, Webster, Mercille and Desaulniers in St-Lambert toward Lafayette. It would continue to Montreal-Sud and Longueuil.
 Greenfield Park/Mackayville: A second branch went up Churchill St. in Greenfield Park and Edward Blvd. in Mackayville (now Édouard Boulevard in the borough of St-Hubert).

Suburban streetcars ran every twenty minutes.

Interurban service 
Interurban trains took the same tracks as the suburban streetcars, up the Greenfield Park/Mackayville branch up to a right of way operated by Vermont Central Railway. From there, it continued past Mackayville through the modern-day borough of Saint-Hubert and the cities of Carignan, Chambly, Richelieu, Marieville, Rougement, Saint-Paul-d'Abbotsford to Granby, with a spur leaving Marieville servicing Sainte-Angèle-de-Monnoir.

Five to six interurban trains ran in each direction per day between Montreal and Granby. More stopped at Marieville, and a few ended at Ste. Angele. Interurban trains often had three cars.

Freight 
Freight traffic was never significant compared to other intercity services in Canada. Instead of rolling down urban streets, and to avoid the weight limits on the shoulder of the Victoria Bridge, freight trains could connect to the rest of the Canadian National Railway network at a junction in Southwark rail yards (along today's Route 116 between Vieux-Longueuil and Saint-Hubert).

Infrastructure and equipment

Electrical 
The railroad was "the first direct current line in Canada to use catenary construction."

Electrical power was provided by Montreal Light, Heat & Power from a dam on the Richelieu River between Chambly and Richelieu. Substations were located in St. Lambert, Chambly, Rougemont and Granby.

Rolling stock 

In April 1911 the rolling stock of the railway consisted of eight passenger cars built by the Ottawa Car Co., two passenger and baggage cars, two trailer cars, one flat car, one sweeper car and one snow plow. All cars except the snow plow and trailers had electric drive motors.

By 1937 the rolling stock counted 13 suburban passenger cars, 2 combine motor cars, 3 suburban trailer cars, 4 express cars, 11 interurban passenger cars, 6 interurban trailers, 4 milk cars, as well as a number of special service cars, work cars and locomotives.

The main manufacturers of these railcars were National Steel Car, Ottawa Car Company and the railway's parent company, Grand Trunk.

Stations and stops

Legacy

Passenger Rail Service 

CN continued to run diesel passenger trains for a short time between Montreal Central Station and Granby, and onward to Waterloo, using the M&SCRC's track after its junction with the CN St-Hyacinthe line. Service was finally cut on May 1, 1961 following an approval by the Federal Board of Transport Commissioners.

Communities 
The offering of suburban service to Montreal allowed new communities to spring up along the railway. Many were English-speaking immigrants working in the rail yards of Montreal who would commute into the city. Though many Anglophones left these neighbourhoods following the election of the Parti Québécois in 1976 and the referendum on sovereignty in 1980, their legacy can be found in the names of boroughs (Greenfield Park) and streets (i.a. Kensington, Cornwall, Glenn) that retain their British heritage.

Stations and Buildings 

The building that served as the Montreal terminal is still standing today.

The CN station that served as the terminus in Granby was demolished in 1993 and a replica built a few hundred meters away.

The workshop and garage located in Granby was demolished in 2009. A small public place now stands in its place, and the "M&SCRy." stone engaging and the facade with doors have been preserved as a monument.

Track 
Track that was part of the interurban service between Mackayville and the junction at Eastern Greenfield, is today part of CN's Rouses Point subdivision and used by Amtrak's Adirondack daily between New York Penn Station and Montreal Central Station. The Adirondack does not service any former station of the M&SCRC.

CN later fully abandoned the rail line between Marieville and Granby in 1993.
In 2013, the Quebec Ministry of transportation purchased a 22 kilometre stretch of the disused right of way between Longueuil and Chambly. No transit plans have been announced.

Today, much of the rail line's right-of-way has since been converted into cycling paths, including La Route des champs, a span of about 40 kilometres between Marieville and Granby.

La Montée du Chemin Chambly, a part of Route Verte 1 and the Trans Canada Trail, follows the path of the railway between the borough of Saint-Hubert in Longueuil and the city of Carignan.

Preserved rolling stock 

Some rail cars have been preserved in museum collections. Examples include:

 Interurban streetcar M&SC 611 and Interurban railcar M&SC 104 have been preserved in the collection at the Exporail Canadian Railway Museum in Saint-Constant, Quebec.
 Interurban streetcar M&SC 610 is at the Seashore Trolley Museum in Kennebunkport, Maine.
 Interurban railcar M&SC 107 is in the collection of the Halton County Radial Railway museum.

Notes

References

Books 

 
 
 Grumley, J.R. Thomas, Montreal & Southern Counties Railway Co., Ottawa, Bytown Railway Society, 2004, 67 pages. ,

Articles

Maps of railway lines and stations

Other

External links
Canadian Rail no 353 (1981)
East Greenfield: Montreal and Southern Counties Railway
Trainweb.com : Montreal and Southern Counties
Montreal Area Historical Rail Map (shows Montreal and Southern Counties Railway)

Transport in Longueuil
Transport in Montreal
Interurban railways in Quebec
Defunct Quebec railways
Predecessors of the Grand Trunk Railway
Rail transport in Montérégie
Street railways in Quebec
Transport in Granby, Quebec
Transport in Saint-Lambert, Quebec
La Vallée-du-Richelieu Regional County Municipality
Rouville Regional County Municipality
La Haute-Yamaska Regional County Municipality
Chambly, Quebec
Electric railways in Canada
Standard gauge railways in Canada